The Maples is a historic home located at Smithsburg, Washington County, Maryland, United States. It is a  two-story, six-bay stone and log dwelling trimmed in black and white.  The house features a rather elaborate neoclassical cornice with dentils matching the entrance frontispiece and extending along the entire length of the house. The stone section postdates the log structure and was erected between 1790 and 1810.

It was listed on the National Register of Historic Places in 1975.

References

External links
, including photo from 1973, at Maryland Historical Trust

Houses on the National Register of Historic Places in Maryland
Houses in Washington County, Maryland
Houses completed in 1790
National Register of Historic Places in Washington County, Maryland